is a popular area located in the Naka ward of Nagoya, central Japan.

Ōsu is a historic area which has many small shops offering everything from Japanese traditional food to handicrafts. A large department store is OSU301. It is popular amongst fashionable young people as well. 

The  is held every year in October. The highlight is the parade of the oiran. 

There are a number of temples and shrines and religious institutions in this area.

Ōsu Kannon Station is located at Ōsu.

Ryukasui at Seijuin 
Ryukasui was said to be one of three of the highest quality water springs in Owari Province. It was supplied from a well in front of the gate of Seijuin, which was abolished around 1870 during the religious reforms of the Meiji era. Ryukasui was generally used as an offering and when the Shōgun stopped there on his way to Kyoto, it was presented to him as drinking water.

External links 

 Homepage of Ōsu
 ooooosu fashion